Douglass School is a historic school building for African-American children in Bristol, Virginia. The original section was built in 1921, with additions and alterations from about 1929 and 1963. It is a two-story, three-bay brick building with a flat roof.

It was listed on the National Register of Historic Places in 2005.

References

African-American history of Virginia
School buildings on the National Register of Historic Places in Virginia
School buildings completed in 1921
National Register of Historic Places in Bristol, Virginia
Buildings and structures in Bristol, Virginia
1921 establishments in Virginia